The Tabeetha School is a school on Yefet Street #21 in Jaffa, a district of Tel Aviv, Israel, run by the Church of Scotland which "welcomes all children regardless of race, nationality, gender or religion". It was founded in 1863.

References

1863 establishments in Ottoman Syria
Church of Scotland
Jaffa
Schools in Tel Aviv